Mtito Andei is a town in Makueni County, Kenya.

Location
Mtito Andei is located in Makueni County, in the country's southeastern region, by road southeast of Nairobi, the capital. The geographic coordinates of Mtito Andei are:2° 41' 24.00"S, 38° 10' 12.00"E (Latitude: −2.69000; Longitude: 38.17000).

From Mtito Andei to Voi is a distance of 96 km

Overview
Mtito Andei is a small town on the Mombasa to Nairobi Railway and Highway.  It lies at the western edge of Tsavo National Park and two entrance gates into the park are located in the town.  The town is administered by Mtito Andei Town Council which serves as the sub-county headquarters for Mtito Andei Sub-county  in which the town is located.

Population
According to the 1999 Kenya National Census, Mtito Andei's urban population was counted at 4,304 (1999 Census).
In 2010, the population of the town was estimated at about 4,760.

Transport

Mtito Andei lies on the main rail line of Kenya Railways, between Mombasa and Nairobi. The town is also served by Mtito Andei Airport. The main thoroughfare going through town is the Mombasa-Nairobi Road (A109). Going south east, the road continues on to Tsavo, then Voi and eventually Mombasa. Going north west, the road goes through Kibwezi and Sultan Hamud, before entering Nairobi.

Points of interest
The points of interest located in Mtito Andei or close to its borders include the following:
 The offices of Mtito Andei Town Council
 The headquarters of Mtito Andei County
 The Nairobi-Mombasa Road – The road passes through the middle of town in a northwest to southeast direction
 The Mombasa-Nairobi Railway Line – The railway runs parallel to the Road
 Mtito Andei Central Market
 The Mtito Andei Post Office
 Tsavo National Park – The town lies just outside the park.
 Mtito Andei Airport

See also
 Transport in Kenya
 Railway stations in Kenya

References

External links
Location of Mtito Andei At Google Maps

Makueni County
Populated places in Eastern Province (Kenya)
Tsavo National Park